Polyp may refer to:

Polyp (zoology)
Polyp (medicine)
Polyp (cartoonist)